The second most recent transit of Venus observed from Earth took place on 8 June 2004. The event received significant attention, since it was the first Venus transit after the invention of broadcast media. No human alive at the time had witnessed a previous Venus transit since that transit occurred on 6 December 1882 in the 19th century.

European Southern Observatory (ESO) and the European Association for Astronomy Education (EAAE) launched the VT-2004 project, together with the Institut de Mécanique Céleste et de Calcul des Éphémérides (IMCCE) and the Observatoire de Paris in France, as well as the Astronomical Institute of the Academy of Sciences of the Czech Republic. This project had 2,763 participants all over the world, including nearly 1,000 school classes. The participants made a measurement of the astronomical unit (AU) of 149 608 708 km ± 11 835 km which had only a 0.007% difference to the accepted value.

Visibility

The entire transit was visible from Europe, most of Asia, and almost all of Africa. The beginning was visible before sunset from easternmost Asia and Australia. The end was visible after sunrise from the westernmost fringe of Africa, eastern North America, and much of South America. The transit was not visible at all from western North America, southern South America, Hawaii, or New Zealand. The regions from which the transit were visible are shown on the map to the right.

Timing
The following table and image give times for various events (respectively, first contact, second contact, the midpoint, third contact and fourth contact) during the transit on 8 June 2004 for a hypothetical observer at the center of the Earth. Due to parallax, times observed at different points on Earth may differ from the following by as much as ±7 minutes.

Media

See also 
 Transit of Venus
 Transit of Venus, 2012

External links 

June 8, 2004: The Transit of Venus by John E. Westfall, ALPO
The Venus Transit Across the Sun; observations from Hartwick College in Oneonta, NY, USA
Several videos of the transit as seen by the TRACE satellite
Archive of observations in Bangalore
Predictions for the 2004 Transit of Venus
The Transit of Venus: Where to See It
Photos taken by BBC News readers
Venus Transit 2004 Homepage at European Southern Observatory
Venus Transit 2004 – Miami, FL, USA 
HM Nautical Almanac Office: 2004 Transit of Venus

Images of the 2004 Transit of Venus by Crayford Manor House Astronomical Society

References 

2004
2004 in science
Articles containing video clips
June 2004 events